Aeroflot Flight 418 was an international passenger flight operated by a Tupolev Tu-154A, registered CCCP-85102, that was operating the second leg of a scheduled Luanda–Malabo–N'Djamena–Tripoli–Moscow passenger service. The plane crashed on into a mountain near Malabo Airport on Bioko Island, Equatorial Guinea on 1 June 1976.

Description
All 42 passengers and 4 crew perished.

Investigation
The cause of the accident could not be determined, but the investigation commission suspected a possible failure of the MSRP-12 radar on the aircraft may have led the crew to be unaware of their position.

See also

Aeroflot accidents and incidents
Aeroflot accidents and incidents in the 1970s

References

Aviation accidents and incidents in 1976
1976 in the Soviet Union
Aviation accidents and incidents in Equatorial Guinea
Airliner accidents and incidents involving controlled flight into terrain
Accidents and incidents involving the Tupolev Tu-154
418
1976 in Equatorial Guinea
June 1976 events in Africa